Oenobotys is a genus of moths of the family Crambidae.

Species
Oenobotys glirialis (Herrich-Schäffer, 1871)
Oenobotys invinacealis Ferguson, Hilburn & Wright, 1991
Oenobotys pantoppidani (Hedemann, 1894)
Oenobotys texanalis Munroe, E. & A. Blanchard in Munroe, 1976
Oenobotys vinotinctalis (Hampson, 1895)

References

Natural History Museum Lepidoptera genus database

Pyraustinae
Crambidae genera
Taxa named by Eugene G. Munroe